Margaret Gleghorne, also known as Maggie Gleghorne, is a former women's field hockey player from Northern Ireland who represented both Ireland and Great Britain at international level.

Domestic teams

Ballymena Academy
Between 1967 and 1974 Gleghorne attended Ballymena Academy. In 1972–73 she was a member of the academy team that were joint winners of the Ulster Senior Schoolgirls' Cup. In 1972 Gleghorne was still a schoolgirl at Ballymena Academy when she made her senior debut for Ireland aged sixteen.

Pegasus
Gleghorne played club level field hockey for Pegasus.

Ulster
Gleghorne represented Ulster at interprovincial level, both as a schoolgirl and as a senior player. By the time she left school in 1974, she had played for the Ulster schoolgirls team for five years in succession. By the age of fifteen, she had made seven senior interprovincial appearances, the first one gained against Leinster in 1970.

International

Ireland
In 1972 Gleghorne made her senior debut for Ireland against Scotland. At the time she was still a sixteen year old schoolgirl at Ballymena Academy. In 1972–73 she scored the winning goal for Ireland against England at Wembley in front of a crowd of 60,000. In 1977 she was a member of the Ireland team that won the Triple Crown. She captained Ireland when they won the 1983 Intercontinental Cup in Kuala Lumpur. Her Ireland teammates from this era included Mary Geaney. She also represented Ireland at the 1984 Women's EuroHockey Nations Championship and the 1986 Women's Hockey World Cup. In 2010 she was inducted into the Irish Hockey Association Hall of Fame. She retired from the Ireland squad in 1986–87.

Great Britain
Gleghorne also represented Great Britain. She was first called up for the Great Britain squad in 1979–80 in preparation for the 1980 Summer Olympics. In 1984 while playing for Great Britain, she was named the team's Player of the Year.

Family
Two of Gleghorne's nephews are senior men's field hockey internationals. Her brother, Andy, is the father of Paul and Mark Gleghorne. Paul has played for Ireland while his brother, Mark has played for Ireland, England and Great Britain.

Honours
Ireland
Intercontinental Cup
Winners: 1983  
Triple Crown
Winners: 1977  
Ballymena Academy
Ulster Senior Schoolgirls' Cup
Winners: 1972–73

References

Living people
Ireland international women's field hockey players
Female field hockey players from Northern Ireland
Irish female field hockey players
British female field hockey players
Female field hockey forwards
People educated at Ballymena Academy
Year of birth missing (living people)
Sportspeople from Ballymena